The U.S. Post Office is a historic building in Nebraska City, Nebraska. It was built by Harry Wales in 1888, and designed in the Romanesque Revival style by M.E. Bell. By the 1970s, it was "the oldest Post Office in continuous use in Nebraska."

It was intended to serve as a U.S. Court House and Post Office, but there is no record of it ever having served as a courthouse. It has been listed on the National Register of Historic Places since September 3, 1971.

References

Post office buildings on the National Register of Historic Places in Nebraska
National Register of Historic Places in Otoe County, Nebraska
Romanesque Revival architecture in Nebraska
Government buildings completed in 1888